Eoplatax is an extinct genus of prehistoric spadefish that lived during the Lutetian of Monte Bolca.  They are closely allied to the extant genus, Platax, more commonly known as "batfish."
 
The two genera are extremely similar in morphology, and coexisted sympatrically during the Eocene of Monte Bolca.

See also

 Prehistoric fish
 List of prehistoric bony fish

References

Eocene fish
Ephippidae
Fossils of Italy